Yufa Town is a town within Daxing District, Beijing, China. It shares border with Panggezhuang Town in its north, Lixian and Jiuzhou Towns in its east, Gu'an County in its south, and Zhuozhou City in its west. Its population was 71,812 in 2020.

The name Yufa literally translates to "Elm Plough".

History

Administrative divisions 
In the year 2021, 57 subdivisions constituted Yufa Town, where 9 of them were communities, 47 were villages, and 1 was an industrial area:

Gallery

See also 

 List of township-level divisions of Beijing

References 

Towns in Beijing
Daxing District